Elimination may refer to:

Science and medicine 
Elimination reaction, an organic reaction in which two functional groups split to form an organic product
Bodily waste elimination, discharging feces, urine, or foreign substances from the body via defecation, urination, and emesis
Drug elimination, clearance of a drug or other foreign agent from the body
Elimination, the destruction of an infectious disease in one region of the world as opposed to its eradication from the entire world
Hazard elimination, the most effective type of hazard control
Elimination (pharmacology), processes by which a drug is eliminated from an organism

Logic and mathematics 
 Elimination theory, the theory of the methods to eliminate variables between polynomial equations.
 Disjunctive syllogism, a rule of inference
 Gaussian elimination, a method of solving systems of linear equations
 Fourier–Motzkin elimination, an algorithm for reducing systems of linear inequalities
 Process of elimination, enumerating all answers and discarding each unfit answer
 Variable elimination

Games and competitions
Elimination tournament, a knock-out style of tournament competition
Elimination (arcade game), 1974 arcade game by Atari Inc. subsidiary Key Games
Elimination, a variant of the "lifestyle-invading" game Assassin, played with clothes-pins
Elimination from postseason contention in a sports league

Music 
Elimination, a 2002 album by Deceptikonz
Elimination (Jughead's Revenge album), 1994
"Elimination", a 1989 single from Overkill's album The Years of Decay

Accounting 
Elimination (accounting), the act of recording amounts in a consolidation statement to remove the effects of inter-company transactions

See also
Eliminator (disambiguation)